The Khodzhakul Formation is a Cenomanian aged geologic formation in Uzbekistan. Dinosaur remains are among the fossils that have been recovered from the formation. As well as those of Mammals. It is part of the same stratigraphic succession as the overlying Bissekty Formation.

Fossil content 
One of the largest mammals of the Mesozoic, Oxlestes, occurred in this formation, and may have predated on dinosaur species.

See also 
 List of dinosaur-bearing rock formations

References

Bibliography 
  

Geologic formations of Uzbekistan
Upper Cretaceous Series of Asia
Cenomanian Stage
Sandstone formations
Deltaic deposits
Paleontology in Uzbekistan